The Paris School of Economics (PSE; French: École d'économie de Paris) is a French research institute in the field of economics.  It offers MPhil, MSc, and PhD level programmes in various fields of theoretical and applied economics, including macroeconomics, econometrics, political economy and international economics.

PSE is a brainchild of the École des Hautes Études en Sciences Sociales (EHESS, where the students are enrolled primarily), the École Normale Supérieure, the École des Ponts and University of Paris 1 Pantheon-Sorbonne, and it is physically located on the ENS campus of Jourdan in the 14th arrondissement of Paris. It was founded in 2006 as a coalition of universities and grandes écoles to unify high-level research in economics across French academia, and was first presided by economist Thomas Piketty. Since its foundation it has gained a certain amount of academic weight, and according to a ranking released by project RePEc in May 2020, it was ranked as the fifth-best university-level economics department in the world and first in Europe. Paris School of Economics' ranking has consistently risen since it was listed on the rankings on RePEc.

Status 
Created in December 2006, the Paris School of Economics has the status of fondation reconnue d’utilité publique (a Public interest foundation). This status allows PSE to draw on both public and private funding.

PSE is one of the "Fondation de Coopération Scientifique" (Scientific Research Foundations), a new type of foundation created by the Government to develop centres of excellence in France. Scientific Research Foundations operate according to the same rules as Public interest foundations.
 The Paris School of Economics is administered by a Board of Directors consisting of representatives of the public and private partners, researchers, and outside personalities.
 The Scientific Council consists of international researchers, external to PSE, of whom at least 50% work abroad. The Scientific Council evaluates the quality of both current and proposed teaching and research programmes. 3 Nobel Prizes laureates are members of the PSE Scientific Council.

Degree programs 
The foundation offers teaching through four Master programmes (APE, PPD, EDCBA, and Economics & Psychology) and a PhD Economics programme (within EDE-EPS).

Master's programs 
Master APE: Analysis and Policy in Economics
Master PPD: Public Policy and Development
Master EDCBA: Economic Decision and Cost-Benefit Analysis
Master Economics and Psychology

PSE in international rankings 
Its contributory economics faculties, including the Ecole Normale Superieure, École des Hautes Études en Sciences Sociales, the Ecole Polytechnique and ENSAE, are ranked between the top 13 among 53 departments worldwide by publication output of the top five scholars. According to the global economics departments ranking released in May 2020 by RePEc, Paris School of Economics was ranked at 5th worldwide, 1st in Europe.

International partnerships

The Paris School of Economics has exchange students programs with some universities such as New York University or the University of California, Berkeley. It is also member of many exchange networks :
 Economic Behavior and Interaction Models (EBIM): Bielefeld University
 European Doctorate in Economics Erasmus Mundus (EDEEM): Amsterdam University, Bielefeld University, Lisbon University, University of Louvain, Venice University
 Programme doctoral européen en économie quantitative (EDP): Florence University, London School of Economics (LSE), Bonn University, Leuven University, Tel-Aviv University, Pompeu Fabra University
 Policy Design and Evaluation Research in Developing Countries (PODER): Bocconi University, London School of Economics (LSE), Stockholm University, Namur University, Pompeu Fabra University, Cape Town University
 Quantitative Economics Doctorate (QED): Alicante University, Amsterdam University, Bielefeld University, Copenhagen University, Lisbon University, Venice University, Vienna University

The World Inequality Report 2018 compiled by Facundo Alvaredo, Lucas Chanel, Thomas Piketty, Emmanuel Saez, and Gabriel Zucman was released on 14 December 2017 at the Paris School of Economics during the first WID.world Conference held on 14 December and 15 December, which was sponsored by the Paris School of Economics, the Institute for New Economic Thinking (INET), the Washington Center for Equitable Growth (CEG), the Ford Foundation, and the European Research Council. World Wealth and Income Database (WID), an open source database, which is part of an international collaborative effort of over a hundred researchers in five continents. The WID is an extension of the earlier World Top Incomes Database (WTID).

Alumni
Esther Duflo (MIT), 2019 Nobel Memorial Prize in Economic Sciences Laureate, 2010 John Bates Clark Medal Laureate
Gilles Duranton (University of Pennsylvania)
Emmanuel Farhi (Harvard University)
Xavier Gabaix (New York University)
Pierre-Olivier Gourinchas (University of California, Berkeley)
Thierry Magnac (Toulouse School of Economics)
Thomas Philippon (New York University)
Thomas Piketty (Paris School of Economics), author of Capital in the Twenty-First Century
Helene Rey (London Business School)
Patrick Rey (Toulouse School of Economics)
Emmanuel Saez (University of California, Berkeley), 2009 John Bates Clark Medal Laureate
Benoît Cœuré (European Central Bank)
Gabriel Zucman (University of California, Berkeley)

Scientific council
Francesco Billari (Nuffield College Oxford University)
Jess Benhabib (New York University)
Pierre-André Chiappori (Columbia University)
Rodolphe Dos Santos (University of Strasbourg)
Marion Fourcade (University of California, Berkeley)
Jordi Gali (CREI Barcelona, University of Pompeu Fabra)
Duncan Gallie (Nuffield College Oxford University)
Oliver Hart (Harvard University)
Naomi Lamoreaux (Yale University)
Costas Meghir (Yale University)
Daniel McFadden (University of California, Berkeley)
Sir James Mirrlees (Chinese University of Hong Kong)
Patrick Rey (Université de Toulouse)
Dani Rodrik (Kennedy School of Government of Harvard)
Roy Wong Bin (UCLA)

See also
Abdul Latif Jameel Poverty Action Lab
Labex Refi

References

External links
 Paris School of Economics official website
 "APE: Analyse et Politique Economiques" Graduate Program of PSE
 "PPD: Public policy and development" Graduate Program of PSE

 
Economics schools
Universities and colleges in Paris
Educational institutions established in 2006
2006 establishments in France